Singarathoppe is a small village near East Fort in the Thiruvananthapuram district of Kerala state, south India. It was here Ayya Vaikundar was jailed by Kalineesan (Swathi Thirunal Rama Varma).

References

Villages in Thiruvananthapuram district